"Ireland Must Be Heaven, for My Mother Came from There" is a popular song with the music composition by Fred Fisher and lyrics done by Joseph McCarthy and Howard Johnson, published in 1916.
 
A version of the song recorded by Charles W. Harrison in 1916 is considered to have been a #1 hit in its day.

The song was also popular in Britain in 1916.

References

Songs with lyrics by Joseph McCarthy (lyricist)
Songs with lyrics by Howard Johnson (lyricist)
1916 songs
Songs written by Fred Fisher